Graeme Harper is a creative writer and academic, who writes under his own name and under the pseudonym Brooke Biaz. He received the inaugural New Writers Banjo Award in 1988, for his novel Black Cat, Green Field.

Education and academic career
In 1993, Harper received the degree of Doctor of Creative Arts, specialising in creative writing, at the University of Technology, Sydney. This was the first doctorate in creative writing conferred in Australia  He finished his PhD at the University of East Anglia in 1996.

He is the Dean of The Honors College at Oakland University in Michigan, USA, a founding institution in US Honors colleges and programs. There he also directs the Mid-West Center for Undergraduate Research (MCUR). He is chair of the At-Large Division of the Council on Undergraduate Research. and Director of the National Society for Minorities in Honors 

He was the founding director of the National Institute for Excellence in the Creative Industries at Bangor University, and the founding chair of the School of Creative Arts, Film and Media at the University of Portsmouth.

From 2003 to 2015 he was a panelist and assessor at Great Britain's Arts and Humanities Research Council (AHRC), and he is a former member (1998-2001) of the European Commission's Directorate-General for Education, Youth, Sport and Culture Panel of Experts (DGX)

He was elected a Fellow of the Royal Society of Medicine (RSM) in 2005 and is also an elected Fellow of the Royal Society for the Encouragement of Arts, Manufactures and Commerce (RSA), the Royal Anthropological Institute, and the Royal Geographical Society (RGS).

He is founding Editor-in-Chief of the journal New Writing: the International Journal for the Practice and Theory of Creative Writing, and Editor of the Creative Industries Journal.. He is Co-Editor (with O. Evans) of Studies in European Cinema and (with O. Evans and C. Johnston) of the Journal of European Popular Culture

Publications

Fiction
 1988: Black Cat, Green Field 
 2000: Swallowing Film 
 2005: Small Maps of the World 
 2008: Moon Dance 
 2009: Camera Phone 
 2013: Making Up 
 2015: The Invention of Dying 
 2018: The Japanese Cook 
 2022: Releasing the Animals

Non-Fiction
 2001: Colonial and Postcolonial Incarceration 
 2002: Comedy Fantasy and Colonialism 
 2005: Signs of Life: Medicine and Cinema (With Andrew Moor) 
 2006: Teaching Creative Writing 
 2006: The Unsilvered Screen: Surrealism on Film (With Rob Stone) 
 2008: Creative Writing Guidebook 
 2009: Authors at Work: the Creative Environment (Essays and Studies) (With Ceri Sullivan) 
 2009: Sound and Music in Film and Visual Media: A Critical Overview (With Section Editors, Ruth Doughty and Jochen Eisentraut) 
 2010: On Creative Writing 
 2011: Cinema and Landscape: Film, Nation and Cultural Geography (With J. Rayner) 
 2011: Creative Writing Studies: Practice, Research and Pedagogy (With Jeri Kroll) 
 2012: Key Issues in Creative Writing (With Dianne Donnelly) 
 2012: Research Methods in Creative Writing (With Jeri Kroll) 
 2013: Film Landscapes: Design, Discovery and Communication (With J. Rayner) 
 2013: New Ideas on the Writing Arts: Practice, Culture, Literature 
 2013: The Blackwell Companion to Creative Writing 
 2014: The Future for Creative Writing 
 2015: Creative Writing and Education 
 2016: Exploring Creative Writing 
 2017: Changing Creative Writing in America 
 2017: Filmurbia: Cinema and the Suburbs (With D. Forrest and J. Rayner) 
 2018: Critical Approaches to Creative Writing 
 2018: Diversity, Equity and Inclusion in Honors Education 
 2019: Honors Education: Excellence, Innovation, Ingenuity 
 2019: The Desire to Write 
 2019: Thinking Creative Writing 
 2020: Creative Writing: Drafting, Revising, Editing (With Jeri Kroll) 
 2020: Discovering Creative Writing 
 2020: Responding to Creative Writing 
 2021: Honors Education and the Foundation of Fairness: A Question of Equity 
 2022: Honors Education Around the World''

References

External links 
 Official website

Living people
English writers
Australian writers
Alumni of the University of East Anglia
English emigrants to Australia
Year of birth missing (living people)